The 2016–2017 Jordanian Pro League (known as the Al-Manaseer Jordanian Pro League, named after Ziyad AL-Manaseer Companies Group for sponsorship reasons) was the 65th season of Jordan Premier League since its inception in 1944. The season started on 28 October 2016 and concluded on 6 May 2017.

Al-Wehdat are the defending champions of the 2015–16 season. Sahab and Mansheyat Bani Hasan entered as the two promoted teams.

On 6 May 2017, Al-Faisaly won the title after a 4–0 home win over Sahab. It was their 33rd Premier League title.

Al-Jazeera's Mardik Mardikian won the Golden Boot with 14 goals.

Teams
The league comprises 12 teams, 10 from the 2015–16 campaign, as well as two teams promoted from the 2015–16 Division 1.

Stadiums and locations

Personnel and kits

Managerial changes

Foreign players
The number of foreign players is limited to 3 per team, and should not be a goalkeeper.

Results

League table

Results table

Season progress

Statistics

Top scorers

Hat-tricks

References

Jordanian Pro League seasons
2016–17 in Jordanian football
Jordan Prenier League